Bonnie Bonnell (August 1, 1905 – March 14, 1964) was an actress who played "straight woman" in seven early short comedies, most of which featured the Three Stooges when they worked with Ted Healy, between 1933 and 1934.

Career
According to Stooges biographers, she was also Healy's offscreen girlfriend during that time. In the film Plane Nuts, she plays a "fourth stooge", working as a partner to Moe, Larry, and Curly as they torment Healy during his stage act. She was a stage and vaudeville actress for several years before her film career.

Bonnell died of liver failure on March 14, 1964, at age 58 in Santa Monica, California.

Filmography
Nertsery Rhymes (1933) as The Fairy Godmother (billed as "Bonny")
Beer and Pretzels (1933) as Bonny
Hello Pop! (1933) as Bonny
Plane Nuts (1933) as Bonnie
Myrt and Marge (1933) as gate crasher
The Big Idea (1934) as cleaning lady
Hollywood on Parade (1934) as woman in bar

References

External links

Bonnie Bonnell at threestooges.net

 The Third Banana:The Mystery of Bonnie Bonnell

1905 births
1964 deaths
Vaudeville performers
Burials at Woodlawn Memorial Cemetery, Santa Monica
20th-century American comedians